The Ventura Theatre is a historic live concert venue in downtown Ventura, California.  This was "the only luxury theatre built in Ventura County in the 1920s in the "style of the great movie palaces." The lavish, elegant interior of gilt and opulence was originally designed by Robert E. Power Studios of San Francisco and has been restored. The theatre with a capacity of 1,150 and a flanking office building were designed by architect L. A. Smith in the Spanish Colonial Revival architecture that was favored by architects of motion picture theaters during the 1920s.

In 1928, Ventura was a bustling oil boom town when the grand opening featured an organ solo, the latest news, Our Gang comedies, a vaudeville act and the movie Excess Baggage. During the period between 1923 and 1929, many other buildings were constructed: the Hobson Brothers Meat Packing Company (1923), the First National Bank of Ventura (1926) (commonly called the Erle Stanley Gardner), the Ventura Hotel (1926), the Elks Lodge - B. P. 0. E. #1430 (1928), the Mission Theater (1928), the Hotel Washington (1928), the Swift & Company Building (1928), and the Masonic Temple (1929). Contemporary downtown Ventura is defined by the theatre and the other extant buildings from this period.

Declared a landmark by the City of Ventura In 1976, the theatre was added to the National Register of Historic Places in 1986. The office building was modernized in 1958 and was not included in the historic designation. The theater currently has an active concert schedule.

Notable Performances

See also
 City of Ventura Historic Landmarks and Districts
National Register of Historic Places listings in Ventura County, California

External links

References

Buildings and structures in Ventura, California
Cinemas and movie theaters in California
Movie palaces
Music venues in California
Theatres in California
Event venues established in 1928
Theatres completed in 1928
National Register of Historic Places in Ventura, California
Theatres on the National Register of Historic Places in California
Spanish Colonial Revival architecture in California
1928 establishments in California